Antonio Rotta (28 February 1828 – 10/11 September 1903) was an Italian painter, mainly of genre subjects.

Biography 

Rotta was born on 28 February 1828 in Gorizia in the Kingdom of Illyria. He enrolled at the Accademia Reale di Belle Arti of Venice, where he studied under Ludovico Lipparini. His early genre paintings of Venetian scenes were followed by a number of religious and history paintings, among them Tiziano istruisce Irene di Spilimbergo ("Titian teaching Irene of Spilimberg"). He returned to genre painting, and produced many scenes of Venetian life, often featuring children. One of the best-known of these was Il Ciabattino, "the cobbler".

Many of his works were sold abroad. In 1891 he exhibited in Berlin.

Rotta was married to a daughter of Lattanzio Querena; they had a son, the painter Silvio Giulio Rotta.

Rotta died in Venice on 10 or 11 September 1903.

Gallery

References

1828 births
1903 deaths
19th-century Italian painters
Italian male painters
20th-century Italian painters
Italian genre painters
Painters from Venice
Accademia di Belle Arti di Venezia alumni
19th-century Italian male artists
20th-century Italian male artists